Auguste-Charles-Joseph Vitu (7 October 1823 – 5 August 1891) was a 19th-century French journalist and writer.

Biography 

The natural son of a Parisian rentier, Vitu began his career as a typographer-worker before becoming a journalist. In 1867 he founded  (which he directed until his death in 1891) and later created the newspaper L’Étendard from which he was lucky to be deposed in August 1868, before the sensational trial filed against the manager Jules Pic. He was chief editor of the Peuple Français at the request of Napoleon III from 1869.

Vitu is mostly known for his book Paris, images et traditions, reprinted several times. He also published a book on the popular jargon of the 15th century and another on Napoleon III whose style of moustache and goatee he adopted.

Auguste Vitu was in turn publisher, political and military historian, literary and theatre critic, novelist, author of finance textbooks. He collaborated with numerous Parisian newspapers and founded Le Bons sens d'Auvergne in Clermont-Ferrand and L'Ami de l'ordre in Grenoble to local policy purposes.

He is buried at Père Lachaise Cemetery (46th division) in Paris. The  in the 15th arrondissement of Paris was named after him in 1912.

Main publications 
date unknown: Histoire de la Typographie, librairie Ch. Delagrave, Paris
1845–1846: Les Chauffeurs du Nord, novel published under the name Vidocq
1851: Révision ou révolution 
1852: L’Empereur à Grenoble 
1854: L’Histoire de Napoléon III et du rétablissement de l’Empire 
1854: Études littéraires sur la Révolution française 
1860: La Résurrection de Lazare, with Henri Murger
1860: Ombres et vieux murs
1860: Contes à dormir debout 
1861: Le Budget de 1862
1864: Le Guide financier 
after 1867: Paris : 450 dessins inédits
1868: L’Histoire civile de l’armée
1868: Le Bilan de l’Empire 
1869: Qui mange le budget ?
1869: Les Réunions publiques à Paris et Les Réunions électorales à Paris, brochure où l’auteur n’a pour documents que des rapports de police qui dénaturent complètement presque partout la pensée des orateurs
1873: Notice sur François Villon
1874: Le Lendemain de l’Empire
1883: La maison de Molière, winner of the prix Montyon in literature awarded by the Académie française.

Honours 
 Chevalier of the Légion d'honneur (15 March 1862 decree)
 Officier of the Légion d'honneur (30 June 1867 decree)

References

External links 

Auguste Vitu on Wikisource
 His books digitized by the BNF

People from Meudon
1823 births
1891 deaths
19th-century French journalists
French male journalists
Chevaliers of the Légion d'honneur
Officiers of the Légion d'honneur
Burials at Père Lachaise Cemetery
19th-century French male writers